Okrzeja  is a village (former town) in the administrative district of Gmina Krzywda, within Łuków County, Lublin Voivodeship, in eastern Poland.

The village has a population of 1,800.

The famous writer Henryk Sienkiewicz was born in the nearby village of Wola Okrzejska.

References

Villages in Łuków County